First Baptist Church is a Conservative Baptist church at 218 E. Eighth Street, at the northwest corner of intersection with N. Olive, in Casa Grande, Arizona.

The church was founded in 1920.  Its building constructed in 1938 was added to the National Register of Historic Places in 2002.  The listing included two contributing buildings.

It was deemed significant "as a good example of the Mission/Spanish Colonial Revival style.... Indicative of the Mission style is the simplicity of form, the arched windows that punctuate the facade, and the minimal use of surface ornamentation. This property, like many properties that utilized revival styles during the era of this building's construction, borrows elements of other revival styles such as Gothic, Tudor and Romanesque. This property also has good integrity, as the only alteration appears to be the addition of solid material in place of glazing in the main arched window light on the front facade." The building is also significant one of only three public buildings in a surveyed area that is of  wood-frame construction.

See also
 List of historic properties in Casa Grande, Arizona

References

Baptist churches in Arizona
Churches on the National Register of Historic Places in Arizona
Mission Revival architecture in Arizona
Churches completed in 1938
Churches in Casa Grande, Arizona
National Register of Historic Places in Pinal County, Arizona